Katehakis is a surname. Notable people with the surname include: 

Alexandra Katehakis, American sex therapist
Michael Katehakis (born 1952), American academic